is an inhabited volcanic island in the Izu archipelago in the Philippine Sea, off the coast of Honshu, Japan,  east of the Izu Peninsula and  southwest of Bōsō Peninsula. As with the other islands in the Izu Island group, Izu Ōshima forms part of the Fuji-Hakone-Izu National Park.

Geography

The island is a stratovolcano with a basaltic composite cone, dating from the late Pleistocene period, between 10,000 and 15,000 years ago. The mountain has been recorded to have erupted numerous times through history and is mentioned as far back as Nara period written records.

Major eruptions occurred in 1965 and 1986, each forcing the temporary evacuation of the inhabitants. The last recorded eruption was in 1990.

Important Bird Area
The island has been recognised as an Important Bird Area (IBA) by BirdLife International because it supports populations of Japanese wood pigeons, Ijima's leaf-warblers, Izu thrushes and Pleske's grasshopper warblers.

Climate
Izu Ōshima has a humid subtropical climate (Köppen climate classification Cfa) with warm summers and cool winters. Precipitation is abundant throughout the year, but is somewhat lower in winter than the rest of the year.

Administration
The island is administered by the Ōshima subprefecture of the Tokyo Metropolitan government.    serves as the local government of the island.

Ōshima Town consists of the six traditional hamlets of Okata (岡田), Motomachi (元町), Senzu, Nomashi, Sashikiji and Habuminato (波浮港), with Motomachi  as the administrative center.

Access
Izu Ōshima  is a popular site for tourists  from both Tokyo and Shizuoka due to its close proximity to the mainland. There are a number of ferries which leave from Takeshiba Sanbashi Pier, near Hamamatsuchō, Tokyo to Motomachi Port.  Ferries also leave from Atami in Shizuoka to Motomachi Port. Both lanes are operated by Tōkai Kisen

There are several flights per day from Ōshima Airport to Chōfu Airport in Chōfu.

In popular culture

Mount Mihara and Izu Ōshima  featured prominently in The Return of Godzilla, as the location in which the JSDF successfully trapped Godzilla after luring him to the crater, whereupon charges were detonated, sending him falling into the magma-filled volcano. Mt. Mihara appeared again in the direct sequel, Godzilla vs. Biollante, in which Godzilla was released when the volcano erupted.

Mt. Mihara and Izu Ōshima were also featured in Koji Suzuki's Ring and its film adaptation as pivotal locations for the story.

In the Pokémon franchise, Cinnabar Island is based on Izu Ōshima.

In the anime Vividred Operation, Izu Ōshima is the home of several protagonists.

Gallery

See also

 List of islands of Japan
 Izu Islands
 Tokyo Islands - English Ship booking and information website of Tokyo Islands(Izu Islands)
 List of volcanoes in Japan

Notes

References
 Hammer, Joshua. (2006).  Yokohama Burning: The Deadly 1923 Earthquake and Fire that Helped Forge the Path to World War II. New York: Simon & Schuster.   (cloth)

External links

 Ōshima Town Official Website  
 Izu-Oshima - Japan Meteorological Agency 
  - Japan Meteorological Agency
 Izu Oshima - Geological Survey of Japan
 
 Tokyo Islands -  - English Ship booking to Tokyo Islands(Izu Islands) and travel Information Page of Izu Oshima and other islands in Tokyo
 

Izu Islands
Islands of Tokyo
Important Bird Areas of the Nanpo Islands
Active volcanoes